The Avella Area School District is a small, rural public school district serving less than 680 students in grades K-12. There is a preschool run in one of the elementary school’s rented rooms but has no affiliation with the Avella School District. The district covers the Borough of West Middletown and Cross Creek Township, Hopewell Township and Independence Township in Washington County, Pennsylvania. The district is headquartered in the unincorporated Village of Avella. According to 2000 federal census data, it served a resident population of 4,497. By 2010, the district's population declined to 4,210 people. In 2009, the district residents' per capita income was $17,193, while the median family income was $42,246. In the Commonwealth, the median family income was $49,501 and the United States median family income was $49,445, in 2010. By 2013, the median household income in the United States rose to $52,100.

Extracurriculars
Avella Area School District offers a wide variety of clubs, activities and an extensive sports program.

Sports
The District funds:

Boys
Baseball - A
Basketball- A
Cross Country - A
Football - A
Rifle - AAAA
Wrestling	- AA

Girls
Basketball - A
Cross Country - A
Rifle - AAAA
Softball - A
Girls' Tennis - AA
Volleyball - A

Junior High School Sports (offered in grades 7 and 8)

Boys
Basketball
Football
Wrestling
Cross Country

Girls
Basketball
Volleyball
Softball
Cross Country

According to PIAA directory July 2016

Notable alumni

Ralph Cindrich, former NFL Linebacker of the New England Patriots (1972), and Houston Oilers (1973–1975).
Bobby Schubenski, owner and founder of BlackCraft Cult and BlackCraft Whiskey.

References

 Public Schools Report: Avella Area Junior/Senior High School
 Public Schools Report: Avella Area Elementary School
 National Center for Educational Statistics

External links
 Official website of Avella Area School District
 Meadowcroft Rockshelter and Museum of Rural Life
 Avella Area Public Library Home Page
 The AD White Research Society

School districts in Washington County, Pennsylvania
Education in Pittsburgh area